Świecie is a town in Kuyavian-Pomeranian Voivodeship, north-central Poland.

Świecie may also refer to:

Świecie, Lower Silesian Voivodeship, village in south-western Poland
Świecie, Brodnica County, village in Kuyavian-Pomeranian Voivodeship (north-central Poland)
Świecie Kołobrzeskie, village in West Pomeranian Voivodeship (north-western Poland)
Świecie nad Osą, village in Kuyavian-Pomeranian Voivodeship (north-central Poland)
Świecie Odrzańskie, Polish name for Schwedt, town in north-eastern Germany